Bhaler is a village in the Balangir district, Odisha, India.

References

Villages in Bolangir district